Schech's Mill is a historic mill in Houston County, Minnesota, United States.  It is one of three watermills in Minnesota still operating solely with water power and the only one to have its original millstones. Built by John Blinn in 1876, it was purchased by a Minneapolis miller, Michael Schech who had emigrated from Bavaria, Germany. The mill produced cornmeal, rye buckwheat, wheat flour, graham flour, and whole wheat cereal, which was sold in Caledonia and Houston, Minnesota. Schech's Mill is unique in the state for retaining intact and operable machinery from the 1870s, after the middlings purifier had been introduced but before millstones were supplanted by roller mills.  In 1922, a concrete dam was built to replace the original wooden one.

Schech Mill is situated in the Driftless Area a region of the American Midwest noted for its deeply carved river valleys.

Private tours of the mill can be arranged most summer weekends which include an authentic flour grinding demonstration.

References

External links

1876 establishments in Minnesota
Grinding mills on the National Register of Historic Places in Minnesota
Flour mills in the United States
German-American culture in Minnesota
Grinding mills in Minnesota
Historic American Engineering Record in Minnesota
Mill museums in Minnesota
Museums in Houston County, Minnesota
National Register of Historic Places in Houston County, Minnesota
Watermills in the United States